is a Japanese actress. Kan made her film debut in 2001 in Pistol Opera. She has also starred in Nobody Knows, Dead Run, Memo, and Asia no Junshin.

Early life

Kan was born in Shizuoka Prefecture, Japan to a Korean father and a Japanese mother. She is fluent in Japanese and Korean.

Filmography

Film

References

21st-century Japanese actresses
Japanese actresses of Korean descent
Japanese people of Korean descent
Living people
1990 births